George Klein may refer to:

George Klein (inventor) (1904–1992), Canadian inventor
George Klein (comics) (died 1969), American comic book artist
George Klein (biologist) (1925–2016), Hungarian-Swedish biologist and writer
George Klein (physician), Canadian cardiologist 
George Klein (DJ) (born 1935–2019), disc jockey and television host
George Klein (Canadian football) (1932–?), Canadian football player
George S. Klein (1917–1971), American psychologist and psychoanalyst
Adam Klein (swimmer) (George Klein IV, born 1988), American swimmer
George G. Klein (soldier) (born c.1921), W.W.II U.S. Army veteran

See also
Georg Klein (disambiguation)
George Klyne (1828–1875), Member of the Legislative Assembly of Manitoba
George Kline (1921–2014), American philosopher, Russian scholar and academic